Planet of the Apes is a 2001 American science fiction adventure film directed by Tim Burton from a screenplay by William Broyles Jr., Lawrence Konner, and Mark Rosenthal. The sixth installment in the Planet of the Apes film series, it is loosely based on the 1963 novel of the same name by Pierre Boulle and serves as a remake of the 1968 film version. The film stars Mark Wahlberg, Tim Roth, Helena Bonham Carter, Michael Clarke Duncan, Paul Giamatti, and Estella Warren. It tells the story of astronaut Leo Davidson (Wahlberg) crash-landing on a planet inhabited by intelligent apes. The apes treat humans as slaves, but with the help of an ape named Ari (Bonham Carter), Leo starts a rebellion.

Development for a Planet of the Apes remake started as far back as 1988 with Adam Rifkin. His project nearly reached the pre-production stage before being canceled. Terry Hayes's script, titled Return of the Apes, would have starred Arnold Schwarzenegger, under the direction of Phillip Noyce. Oliver Stone, Don Murphy, and Jane Hamsher were set to produce. Creative differences ensued between Hayes and distributor 20th Century Fox. Chris Columbus, Sam Hamm, James Cameron, Peter Jackson, and the Hughes brothers later became involved. With Broyles Jr.'s script, Burton was hired as director, and the film was put into active development. Konner and Rosenthal rewrote the script, and filming took place from November 2000 to April 2001.

Planet of the Apes was released in the United States on July 27, 2001, by 20th Century Fox. The film received mixed reviews from critics, who criticized the confusing plot and ending, but praised Rick Baker's prosthetic makeup designs, visual aspects, and musical score. Despite its financial success, Fox chose not to produce a sequel, and later rebooted the film series in 2011 with Rise of the Planet of the Apes.

Plot
In 2029, aboard the United States Air Force space station Oberon, Leo Davidson works closely with apes who are trained for space missions. His favorite ape co-worker is a chimpanzee named Pericles. With a deadly electromagnetic storm approaching the station, a small space pod piloted by Pericles is used to probe the storm. Pericles's pod heads into the storm and disappears. Leo takes a second pod and finds Pericles. Entering the storm, Leo loses contact with the Oberon and, in 5021 A.D., crashes on a planet called Ashlar. He learns that the world is ruled by humanoid apes who speak English, use domesticated horses for transportation, and treat human beings as slaves.

Leo meets a female chimpanzee named Ari, who protests the mistreatment humans receive. Ari decides to buy Leo and a female slave named Daena to have them work as servants in the house of her father, Senator Sandar. Leo escapes his cage and frees other humans. Limbo, an orangutan trader in captured humans, sees them but is taken prisoner to ensure his silence. The murderous General Thade and his junior, Colonel Attar, march ape warriors to pursue the humans. Leo discovers Calima, the forbidden, but holy temple of "Semos", the first ape whom the apes revere as a god.

Calima turns out to be the remains of the Oberon which had crashed on the planet's surface and now looks ancient (the name Calima coming from the sign "CAution LIve aniMAls", the relevant letters being the only ones not covered in dust). According to the computer logs, the station has been there for thousands of years. Leo deduces that when he entered the vortex, he was pushed forward in time, while the Oberon, searching after him, was not, crashing on the planet long before he did.

The Oberon's log reveals that the apes on board, led by Semos, organized a mutiny and  took over the vessel after it crashed. The human and ape survivors of the struggle left the ship and their descendants are the people Leo has encountered since landing. The apes arrive and attack the humans who have gathered to see Leo, although he is able to even the odds when he uses the Oberons last fragments of fuel to fire a final blast at the first wave of apes. The battle stops when a familiar vehicle descends from the sky, which Leo immediately identifies as the pod piloted by Pericles, the chimpanzee astronaut who was pushed forward in time as Leo was and had just now found his way to the planet, the electromagnetic storm actually releasing people from it in an opposite direction in time to their entrance. When Pericles lands and the pod opens, the apes bow, interpreting his arrival as the return of Semos, and hostilities between humans and apes suddenly cease.

Pericles runs into the wreck of the Oberon and Leo runs after him, followed by General Thade. Thade and Leo fight. Pericles tries to help Leo, but Thade throws him hard against a wall. Thade takes Leo's gun from him and tries to fire it at Leo. Leo sees that Thade is within the pilot's deck and closes the automatic door, trapping Thade inside. Thade fires the gun repeatedly at the door but the ricochets create sparks that scare Thade, who huddles under a control panel. Deciding to escape Ashlar and return to Earth, Leo gives Pericles to Ari, who promises to look after him. After saying farewell to Ari and Daena, Leo climbs aboard Pericles's undamaged pod and travels back in time through the same electromagnetic storm, and crashes in Washington, D.C. on Earth. He looks up at what appears to be the Lincoln Memorial, only to find that it is now a monument memorializing General Thade. A swarm of police officers, firefighters, and news reporters descend upon him, revealed to all be apes.

Cast
 Mark Wahlberg as Captain Leo DavidsonAn astronaut who accidentally enters a portal to another world inhabited by talking humanoid apes and is captured by them. Leo leads a rebellion of the planet's humans. Wahlberg had backed out of a commitment to Ocean's Eleven to take this role in Planet of the Apes (Matt Damon was eventually cast in the Ocean's Eleven role). Whereas other actors contending for the Leo Davidson role wanted to see the script before signing a contract, Wahlberg signed on after a five-minute meeting with Burton. To avoid evoking associations with his previous work as an underwear model, Wahlberg did not wear a loincloth, even though Heston had worn one in the original film.
 Tim Roth as General ThadeAn ambitious and brutal chimpanzee military commander who wants control over the ape civilization. Thade also intends to marry Ari, but she denies him due to his cold soul. Roth turned down the role of Severus Snape in Harry Potter and the Sorcerer's Stone because of his commitment to Planet of the Apes. Alan Rickman was eventually cast as Snape. Roth rewrote some scenes to give his character a more frightening presence.
 Helena Bonham Carter as AriA feisty, but benevolent chimpanzee who protests the way humans are treated. She helps Leo lead the rebellion. Burton met Bonham Carter while casting for the film, telling her "Don’t take this the wrong way, but you were the first person I thought of to play a chimpanzee." They were in a relationship for 13 years and had two children.
 Michael Clarke Duncan as Colonel AttarA gorilla military officer who was Thade's closest associate and second in-command. Djimon Hounsou had turned down the role because of scheduling conflicts with The Four Feathers.
 Kris Kristofferson as Karubi, Daena's father. Karubi is killed by Thade while trying to escape. Kristofferson had immediately agreed to be cast. "The director Tim Burton is a hero of mine. I have eight kids and we've seen all of his films from Pee-wee's Big Adventure to Sleepy Hollow many times."
 Estella Warren as DaenaA female slave and Karubi's daughter, she develops a romantic attraction to Leo.
 Paul Giamatti as LimboA comical orangutan who works in the trade business of human slaves. Limbo is caught in the conflict between humans and apes and tries his best to simply survive. Giamatti drew inspiration from W. C. Fields for his performance. While his prosthetic makeup was being applied, Giamatti watched episodes of Ultraman and various Japanese Godzilla films.
 Cary-Hiroyuki Tagawa as General KrullA firm but fair gorilla and former military leader whose career had been destroyed by Thade. Krull became a servant of Senator Sandar and assisted the humans in their rebellion.
 David Warner as Senator Sandar, a politician, who is also Ari's father.
 Erick Avari as Tival, a member of the human resistance.
 Luke Eberl as Birn, a young human who fights in the rebellion.
 Lisa Marie as Nova, Senator Nado's companion.
 Evan Parke as Gunnar, a member of the human resistance.
 Glenn Shadix as Senator Nado.

Other roles include Freda Foh Shen (Bon), Chris Ellis (Lt. Karl Vasich), Anne Ramsay (Lt. Col. Grace Alexander), Michael Jace (Maj. Frank Santos), Andrea Grano (Maj. Maria Cooper), Kam Heskin (Friend at Leo's Party), and Melody Perkins (Friend at Leo's Party). Jonah & Jacob (both uncredited) as Pericles, the trained chimpanzee who works with Leo on the space station.

There are also cameo appearances by Charlton Heston (uncredited) as Zaius, Thade's father, and Linda Harrison (the woman in the cart). Both participated in the first two films in the original series, Planet of the Apes (1968) and Beneath the Planet of the Apes (1970) as George Taylor and Nova, respectively.

Development

Late 1980s
20th Century Fox president Craig Baumgarten was impressed with Adam Rifkin's filmmaking with Never on Tuesday. In 1988, Rifkin was brought in the studio to pitch ideas for films. Rifkin, being a fan of the 1968 Planet of the Apes felt it was best to continue the film series. "Having independent film experience, I promised I could write and direct a huge-looking film for a reasonable price and budget, like Aliens." Fox commissioned Rifkin to write what amounted to a sequel, "but not a sequel to the fifth film, an alternate sequel to the first film". He took influences from Spartacus, with the storyline being "the ape empire had reached its Roman era. A descendant of Charlton Heston's character named Duke would eventually lead a human slave revolt against the oppressive Romanesque apes, led by General Izan. A real sword and sandal spectacular, monkey style. Gladiator did the same movie without the ape costumes."

Titled Return to the Planet of the Apes, the project was put on fast track and almost entered pre-production. Rick Baker was hired to design the prosthetic makeup with Danny Elfman composing the film score. Tom Cruise and Charlie Sheen were in contention for the lead role. "I can't accurately describe in words the utter euphoria I felt knowing that I, Adam Rifkin, was going to be resurrecting the Planet of the Apes. It all seemed too good to be true. I soon found out it was." Days before the film was to commence pre-production, new studio executives arrived at Fox, which caused creative differences between Rifkin and the studio. Rifkin was commissioned to rewrite the script through various drafts. The project was abandoned until Peter Jackson and Fran Walsh pitched their own idea, with the apes going through a Renaissance. In the story, the ape government becomes concerned over the new art works, the humans are revolting and the liberal apes shelter a half-human, half-ape from the gorillas. Roddy McDowall was enthusiastic about their proposal and agreed to play the Leonardo da Vinci-type character they had written for him. However, the executive Jackson spoke to was not a fan of the series and seemingly unaware of McDowall's involvement in the series, and Jackson turned his attention back to Heavenly Creatures.

Oliver Stone
By 1993, Fox hired Don Murphy and Jane Hamsher as producers. Sam Raimi and Oliver Stone were being considered as possible directors, though Stone signed on as executive producer/co-writer with a $1 million salary. On the storyline, Stone explained in December 1993, "It has the discovery of cryogenically frozen Vedic Apes who hold the secret numeric codes to the Bible that foretold the end of civilizations. It deals with past versus the future. My concept is that there's a code inscribed in the Bible that predicts all historical events. The apes were there at the beginning and figured it all out."

Stone brought Terry Hayes to write the screenplay entitled Return of the Apes. Set in the near future, a plague is making humans extinct. Geneticist Will Robinson discovers the plague is a genetic time bomb embedded in the Stone Age. He time travels with a pregnant colleague named Billie Rae Diamond to a time when Palaeolithic humans were at war for the future of the planet with highly evolved apes. The apes' supreme commander is a gorilla named Drak. Robinson and Billie Rae discover a young human girl named Aiv (pronounced Eve) to be the next step in evolution. It is revealed that it was the apes that created the virus to destroy the human race. They protect her from the virus, thus ensuring the survival of the human race 102,000 years later. Billie Rae gives birth to a baby boy named Adam.

Fox president Peter Chernin called Return of the Apes "one of the best scripts I ever read". Chernin was hoping Hayes' script would create a franchise that included sequels, spin-off television shows and merchandise. In March 1994, Arnold Schwarzenegger signed on as Will Robinson with the condition he had approval of director. Chuck Russell was considered as a possible director before Phillip Noyce was hired in January 1995, while pre-production was nearing commencement with a $100 million budget. Stone first approached Rick Baker, who worked on Rifkin's failed remake, to design the prosthetic makeup, but eventually hired Stan Winston.

Fox became frustrated by the distance between their approach and Hayes' interpretation of Stone's ideas. As producer Don Murphy put it, "Terry wrote a Terminator and Fox wanted The Flintstones". Fox studio executive Dylan Sellers felt the script could be improved by comedy. "What if Robinson finds himself in Ape land and the Apes are trying to play baseball? But they're missing one element, like the pitcher or something." Sellers continued. "Robinson knows what they're missing and he shows them, and they all start playing." Sellers refused to give up his baseball scene, and when Hayes turned in the next script, sans baseball, Sellers fired him. Dissatisfied with Sellers' decision to fire Hayes, Noyce left Return of the Apes in February 1995 to work on The Saint.

Columbus and Cameron
Stone pursued other films of his own, Chernin was replaced by Thomas Rothman, and a drunken Sellers crashed his car, killing a much-loved colleague and earning jail time, while producers Murphy and Hamsher were paid off. "After they got rid of us, they brought on Chris Columbus", Murphy stated. "Then I heard they did tests of apes skiing, which didn't make much sense." Stan Winston was still working on the makeup designs. Columbus brought Sam Hamm, his co-writer on an unproduced Fantastic Four script, to write the screenplay. "We tried to do a story that was simultaneously an homage to the elements we liked from the five films, and would also incorporate a lot of material [from Pierre Boulle's novel] that had been jettisoned from the earlier production," Hamm continued. "The first half of the script bore little resemblance to the book, but a lot of the stuff in the second half comes directly from it, or directly inspired by it."

Hamm's script had an ape astronaut from another planet crash-landing in New York Harbor, launching a virus that will make human beings extinct. Dr. Susan Landis, who works for the Centers for Disease Control and Prevention, and Alexander Troy, an Area 51 scientist, use the ape's spacecraft to return to the virus' planet of origin, hoping to find an antidote. They find an urban environment where apes armed with heavy weapons hunt humans. The main villain was Lord Zaius; in contrast to Dr. Zaius, Lord Zaius was very cruel to the humans. Landis and Troy discover the antidote and return to Earth, only to find in their 74-year absence that apes have taken over the planet. "The Statue of Liberty's once proud porcelain features have been crudely chiseled into the grotesque likeness of a great grinning ape".

Schwarzenegger remained attached, but Fox had mixed emotions with Hamm's script. When Columbus dropped out in late 1995 to work on Jingle All the Way, Fox offered the director's position to Roland Emmerich in January 1996. James Cameron was in talks during the filming of Titanic as writer and producer. Cameron's version would have drawn elements from the original film and its sequel Beneath the Planet of the Apes. After the financial and critical success of Titanic, Cameron dropped out. After learning about his previous involvement, Chernin and Rothman met with Peter Jackson to learn about his original Renaissance idea. Jackson turned down directing the film with Schwarzenegger and Cameron as his producer, recognizing they would probably conflict over the direction. Schwarzenegger left to work on Eraser. Michael Bay then turned down the director's position. Jackson again turned down the project while facing the possible cancellation of The Lord of the Rings in 1998, because he was unenthusiastic following Roddy McDowall's death. In mid-1999, the Hughes brothers were interested in directing but were committed to From Hell.

Pre-production
In 1999, William Broyles Jr. turned down the chance to write the script, but decided to sign on "when I found out I could have an extensive amount of creative control". Fox projected the release date for July 2001, while Broyles sent the studio an outline and a chronicle of the fictional planet "Aschlar". Entitled The Visitor and billed as "episode one in the Chronicles of Aschlar", Broyles' script caught the attention of director Tim Burton, who was hired in February 2000. "I wasn't interested in doing a remake or a sequel of the original Planet of the Apes film," Burton said later. "But I was intrigued by the idea of revisiting that world. Like a lot of people, I was affected by the original film. I wanted to do a 're-imagining'." Richard D. Zanuck signed on as producer in March. "This is a very emotional film for me. I greenlighted the original Apes when I was the head of Fox in 1967."

Under Burton's direction, Broyles wrote another draft, but his script was projected at a $200 million budget. Fox wanted to cut it to $100 million. In August 2000, two months before principal photography, Fox brought Lawrence Konner and Mark Rosenthal for rewrites. Broyles "had a lot of respect with the work they [Konner and Rosenthal] did. And to think that given what I'd done and given what Tim wanted, they navigated the right course." One of the considered endings had Leo Davidson crash-landing at Yankee Stadium, witnessing apes playing baseball. Various alternatives were considered before the filmmakers decided on the final one. The production of Planet of the Apes was a difficult experience for Burton. This was largely contributed by Fox's adamant release date (July 2001), which meant that everything from pre-production to editing and visual effects work was rushed.

Konner and Rosenthal were rewriting the script even as sets were being constructed. Ari, Helena Bonham Carter's character, was originally a princess. She was changed to "a Senator's daughter with a liberal mentality". One of the drafts had General Thade, Tim Roth's character, as an albino gorilla, but Burton felt chimpanzees were more frightening. Limbo, Paul Giamatti's character "was supposed to turn into a good guy. There was supposed to be this touching personal growth thing at the end," Giamatti reflected. "But Tim [Burton] and I both thought that was kind of lame so we decided to just leave him as a jerk into the end."

Filming
Burton wanted to begin filming in October 2000, but it was pushed back to November 6, 2000 and ended in April 2001. Filming for Planet of the Apes began at Lake Powell, where parts of the original film were shot. Due to a local drought, production crews had to pump in extra water. The film was mostly shot at Sony Pictures Studios in Culver City, California, while other filming locations included lava plains in Hawaii and Trona Pinnacles at Ridgecrest. To preserve secrecy, the shooting script did not include the ending. Stan Winston was the original makeup designer but left because of creative differences. Fox considered using computer-generated imagery to create the apes, but Burton insisted on using prosthetic makeup designed by Rick Baker. Baker was previously involved with Adam Rifkin's unproduced remake. Burton commented, "I have a relationship with both of them [Winston and Baker], so that decision was hard," he says. "Stan worked on Edward Scissorhands and Baker did Martin Landau's makeup [as Béla Lugosi in Ed Wood]".

On his hiring, Baker explained, "I did the Dino De Laurentiis version of King Kong in 1976 and was always disappointed because I wasn't able to do it as realistically as I wanted. I thought Apes would be a good way to make up for that." In addition to King Kong, Baker previously worked with designing ape makeup on Greystoke: The Legend of Tarzan, Lord of the Apes, Gorillas in the Mist, and the 1998 remake of Mighty Joe Young. The makeup took 4.5 hours to apply and 1.5 hours to remove. Burton explained, "it's like going to the dentist at two in the morning and having people poke at you for hours. Then you wear an ape costume until nine at night." Burton was adamant that the apes should be substantially "more animal-like; flying through trees, climb walls, swing out of windows, and go ape shit when angry." For a month and a half before shooting started, the actors who portrayed apes attended "ape school". Industrial Light & Magic, Rhythm and Hues Studios and Animal Logic were commissioned for the visual effects sequences. Rick Heinrichs served as the production designer and Colleen Atwood did costume design.

To compose the film score, Burton hired regular collaborator Danny Elfman, who had previously been set as composer when Adam Rifkin was attached to do his own remake of the original back in 1989 before various filmmakers, including but eventually Burton himself, were attempted to do so later on. Elfman noted that his work on Planet of the Apes contained more percussion instruments than usual.

During filming, Roth held a grudge against Heston due to his work with the National Rifle Association: "It was very difficult for me. On one level, there's the man and he's my dad. But on the other level, the whole NRA thing is what it is now. I'm so against it, very vocally so. But it was inappropriate for the workplace. If I'm going to talk to him, I'll talk to him outside the workplace. So it was just two guys in makeup doing a scene."  Roth later claimed he would not have appeared in the film had he known he would be sharing a scene with Heston.

Reception

Box office
Hasbro released a toy line, while Dark Horse Comics published a comic book adaptation. The original release date for the film was July 4, 2001. Planet of the Apes was released on July 27, 2001 in 3,500 theaters across the United States and Canada, grossing $68,532,960 in its opening weekend. This was the second-highest opening weekend of 2001, after Harry Potter and the Sorcerer's Stone. The film also dethroned Star Wars: Episode I – The Phantom Menace for having the best opening for any 20th Century Fox film. At that point, it had the second-highest opening weekend of any film, behind The Lost World: Jurassic Park. It was the second film of the year to cross the $60 million mark during its first three days, following The Mummy Returns. This record would be later joined by Monsters, Inc. and Rush Hour 2. Both the latter film and Planet of the Apes teamed up with Jurassic Park III and American Pie 2  to become the first four consecutive films to make an opening weekend above the $45 million mark. Planet of the Apes crushed X-Mens record for having the largest July opening weekend. The film would hold that record until Austin Powers in Goldmember took it in 2002. Additionally, the film surpassed Batman Returns for scoring the biggest opening weekend for a Tim Burton film. It would go on to hold this record for less than a decade until it was taken by Alice in Wonderland in 2010.

Meanwhile, Planet of the Apes would begin to expand to Asian countries. While the film was unable to take the top chart spot from Hayao Miyazaki's Spirited Away, its opening was still a strong start to the company's international roll-out in one of the most significant international territories. Plus, it had a record opening in Brazil. It took in $1.5 million from 366 screens, beating the previous record held by Independence Day. In Mexico, Planet of the Apes earned $3.1 million from 547 screens, making it the second largest movie opening in the country, after Dinosaur. The film went on to gross $180,011,740 in the United States and Canada and $182,200,000 elsewhere, for a worldwide total of $362,211,740. Planet of the Apes was the tenth-highest-grossing film in North America, and ninth-highest worldwide, of 2001.

Project APE 
To help promote the release of Planet of the Apes, 20th Century Fox collaborated with Geocaching and released an internet marketing campaign nicknamed "Project APE", that involved people going out into the real world. Geocaching was barely a year old at the time, and was just beginning to become more well known. The promotion's backstory, which actually had no connection to the movie, was that a group of renegade humans were placing artefacts (geocaches) around the globe in an effort to reveal an Alternate Primate Evolution. Over the course of several weeks in 2001, a cache containing props and memorabilia from the movie (prop blindfolds, prop knives, posters, trading cards and more)  was released every week. However, the cache's location was not given, but clues were given throughout the week that narrowed down the location until the cache's coordinates were released on a Friday. It was then a race to get to the cache, with the first person arriving at the location getting a pick of the goodies in the cache. The caches were large ammo boxes, with "Project APE" spray painted on the front. Fourteen caches were placed in a series of missions numbered 1–12 (one was "Special Movie" for the movie premiere in New York and there was a Mission 10a & 10b, with 10b being another cache with the London premiere tickets). Evidence points to a potential Mission 13, but no cache page has been found for it. Most of the caches did not last beyond a couple of finds, as most of them were muggled (stolen). Only two caches are active today, with one located outside of Seattle, Washington, and the other in Brazil.

Critical response
On review aggregation website Rotten Tomatoes Planet of the Apes has an approval rating of 44% based on 158 reviews, with an average rating of 5.51/10. The site's critical consensus reads, "This remake of Planet of the Apes can't compare to the original in some critics' minds, but the striking visuals and B-movie charms may win you over." On Metacritic the film has an average score of 50 out of 100, based on 34 critics, indicating "mixed or average reviews". Audiences polled by CinemaScore gave the film an average grade of "B−" on an A+ to F scale.

Roger Ebert of the Chicago Sun-Times gave the film 2½ stars. He praised the twist ending, but felt the film lacked a balanced story structure. 
Peter Travers of Rolling Stone gave a negative review. "Call it a letdown, worsened by the forces of shoddy screenwriting. To quote Heston in both films, 'Damn them, damn them all'."
Kenneth Turan of the Los Angeles Times believed "the actors in the nonhuman roles are mostly too buried by makeup to make strong impressions. Unfortunately, none of the good work counts as much as you'd think it would," Turan said. "Planet of the Apes shows that taking material too seriously can be as much of a handicap as not taking it seriously at all." Elvis Mitchell of The New York Times gave a more favorable review, feeling the script was balanced and the film served its purpose as "pure entertainment". Susan Wloszczyna of USA Today enjoyed Planet of the Apes, feeling most of the credit should go to prosthetic makeup designer Rick Baker.

Much criticism was leveled against the ambiguous ending. Tim Roth, who portrayed General Thade, said "I cannot explain that ending. I have seen it twice and I don't understand anything." Helena Bonham Carter, who played Ari, said, "I thought it made sense, kind of. I don't understand why everyone went, 'Huh?' It's all a time warp thing. He's gone back and he realizes Thade's beat him there." Although the ending was ambiguous, it was closer to the ending of the actual Pierre Boulle book than was the ending of the 1968 Charlton Heston movie version. In the first of two twist endings of the Pierre Boulle book, the astronaut escapes back to planet Earth, only to be greeted by a gorilla in a jeep on the landing strip. Burton claimed the ending was not supposed to make any sense, but it was more of a cliffhanger to be explained in a possible sequel. "It was a reasonable cliffhanger that could be used in case Fox or another filmmaker wanted to do another movie," he explained.

The film was nominated for two BAFTA Awards, one for Best Make-up held by Rick Baker, the other for Best Costume Design. Roth (Supporting Actor), Bonham Carter (Supporting Actress), Colleen Atwood (Costume), and Rick Baker (Make-up) received nominations at the Saturn Awards. Atwood and Baker were nominated at the 55th British Academy Film Awards, while music composer Danny Elfman was nominated for his work at the 43rd Grammy Awards. Planet of the Apes won Worst Remake at the 22nd Golden Raspberry Awards, while Heston (Worst Supporting Actor) and Estella Warren (Worst Supporting Actress) also won awards. At the 2001 Stinkers Bad Movie Awards, the film received nominations for Worst Director (Burton), Worst Supporting Actress (Warren), and Worst Screenplay for a Film Grossing Over $100M Worldwide Using Hollywood Math, but it failed to win any of those.

Future

Cancelled sequel
Fox stated that if Planet of the Apes was a financial success, then a sequel would be commissioned. Ultimately, they decided against pursuing another film. When asked whether he would be interested in working on a follow-up, director Tim Burton replied, "I'd rather jump out a window." Mark Wahlberg and Helena Bonham Carter would have returned if Burton had decided to make another Apes film. Paul Giamatti had been interested in reprising his role. "I think it'd be great to have apes driving cars, smoking cigars," Giamatti said. "Wearing glasses, sitting in a board room, stuff like that." Planet of the Apes was the last film Burton worked on with his former fiancée Lisa Marie. After their relationship broke up, Burton started a relationship with Bonham Carter, who portrayed Ari. Planet of the Apes was also Burton's first collaboration with producer Richard D. Zanuck.

Reboot
Fox returned to the franchise in 2011 with Rise of the Planet of the Apes, a reboot of the series that led to its own sequels.

Video game

In 1998, after 20th Century Fox had greenlit James Cameron's version of the film remake, the company's video game division, Fox Interactive, started planning a video game tie-in. The film project went on hold when Cameron pulled out, but Fox Interactive remained confident a remake would progress eventually and continued with the game. Fox contracted French company Visiware as developer; with the film on hold, the creators developed their own story inspired by Boulle's novel and the original films. The game is an action-adventure in which the player controls astronaut Ulysses after he crashes on the Planet of the Apes. The game was developed for PC and PlayStation.

The game experienced serious delays due to setbacks with the film project and Fox Interactive's decision to co-publish with a third party. Despite its long development, the game missed the debut of Burton's film. Fox Interactive and co-publisher Ubisoft finally released the PC version on September 20, 2001; the PlayStation version followed on August 22, 2002. The game received mostly negative reviews.

Additionally, Ubisoft and developer Torus Games produced a substantially different Planet of the Apes game for Game Boy Advance and Game Boy Color. It is a side-scroller following the first two films; the player controls astronaut Ben on the Planet of the Apes. The Game Boy versions received average reviews.

Home media
Planet of the Apes was released on DVD and VHS on November 20, 2001. DVD rentals grossed  in the United States, . This THX certified two-disc DVD release features rare Nuon technology, which can only be used on Nuon-enhanced DVD players. These Nuon features include viddies and various zoom points during the film. The first disc features audio commentary, cast and crew profiles and enhanced viewing mode. It also contains a DTS 5.1 audio track and DVD-ROM. On the second disc, there are extended scenes, an HBO special, The Making of Planet of the Apes, behind-the-scenes footage, theatrical trailers, TV spots, previews for Moulin Rouge! and Dr. Dolittle 2, posters and press kit, a music promo, screen tests, galleries, multi-angle featurettes and more.

References

Further reading
  Novelization of the film.
  A detailed analysis of the making of the film.

External links

 
 
 
 
 
 

Planet of the Apes films
2001 science fiction films
2001 films
American science fiction films
Remakes of American films
Films scored by Danny Elfman
Films about slavery
Films about apes
Films based on French novels
Films directed by Tim Burton
Films set in Washington, D.C.
Films set in 2029
Films set in the future
Fiction set in the 6th millennium
Films shot in Arizona
Films shot in Sydney
Films shot in California
Films shot in Hawaii
Films shot in Utah
Films shot at Pinewood Studios
Golden Raspberry Award winning films
American post-apocalyptic films
Reboot films
Films about time travel
20th Century Fox films
Films produced by Richard D. Zanuck
American dystopian films
The Zanuck Company films
2000s English-language films
2000s American films